The 2014 Emirates Melbourne Cup was the 154th running of the Melbourne Cup, Australia's most prestigious Thoroughbred horse race. The race, run over 3,200 metres, was held on 4 November 2014, at Flemington Racecourse in Melbourne. Protectionist, ridden by Ryan Moore and trained by German Andreas Wöhler, won the race by four lengths, becoming the first German-trained winner of the Melbourne Cup. Red Cadeaux placed second and Who Shot Thebarman third, with Red Cadeaux the first horse to place second on three occasions.

The total prize money for the race was A$6.2 million, with the winner receiving $3.6 million, as well as a solid gold trophy valued at $175,000. Hosted by the Victoria Racing Club, the Melbourne Cup was one of four major Group-1 races held at Flemington during the Spring Racing Carnival (the others being the Victoria Derby, the Crown Oaks, and the Emirates Stakes). An estimated $800 million was wagered on the race, which was attended by 100,794 people.

Field
The field for the 2014 Melbourne Cup consisted of 24 horses, with the barrier draw conducted three days prior to the race, after the conclusion of the Victoria Derby meeting. The field was one of the oldest in the race's history, with an average age of 6.8 years. Unusually, only two horses in the race were bred in Australia, though a majority of trainers and jockeys were from Australia. Jockeys Glyn and Chad Schofield became the first father and son in the race since 1968, when George and Gary Moore both rode.

Sea Moon was scratched the day before the race, after suffering from an ailment. English horse Cavalryman was scratched on the morning of the race due to foreleg swelling.

† Indicates race favourite

Fatalities

Race favourite Admire Rakti placed last and died shortly after the race from cardiac arrest following ventricular fibrillation.	
Another horse, Araldo, shattered a hind pastern when frightened by a spectator after the race. He was later euthanised.

See also
 List of Melbourne Cup winners

References

External links
 154th Melbourne Cup Carnival 2014 website

2014
Melbourne Cup
Melbourne Cup
2010s in Melbourne
November 2014 sports events in Australia